Did She Mention My Name? is Canadian singer Gordon Lightfoot's third studio album, released in 1968 on the United Artists label. The album marked Lightfoot's first use of orchestration.

Reception

In his Allmusic review, critic Richie Unterberger praised the album, writing "Though a tad more erratic than his earlier efforts, his songwriting remained remarkably consistent. His characteristically bright, uplifting outlook became more diverse as well..."

Track listing
All compositions by Gordon Lightfoot.

Side 1
"Wherefore and Why" – 2:51
"The Last Time I Saw Her" – 5:10
"Black Day in July" – 4:10           
"May I" – 2:19
"Magnificent Outpouring" – 2:20
"Does Your Mother Know" – 3:33

Side 2
"The Mountain and Maryann" – 3:35
"Pussywillows, Cat-Tails" – 2:48
"I Want to Hear It From You" – 2:22
"Something Very Special" – 3:19
"Boss Man" – 2:10
"Did She Mention My Name?" – 2:27

Personnel
Gordon Lightfoot - 6 & 12 string acoustic guitars, vocals
Herbie Lovelle - drums, percussion
Huey McCracken - electric guitar
Red Shea - lead acoustic guitar
John Simon - string arrangements
John Stockfish - bass
Technical
Tim Lewis - cover design
Charles Steiner, Daniel Kramer - photography

References

External links
Album lyrics and chords

1968 albums
Gordon Lightfoot albums
Albums produced by John Simon (record producer)
United Artists Records albums